Virginia's 40th Senate district is one of 40 districts in the Senate of Virginia. It has been represented by Republican Todd Pillion since 2020, succeeding retiring fellow Republican Charles William Carrico Sr. It is currently the most Republican-leaning district in the Virginia Senate.

Geography
District 40 covers the farthest corner of Southwest Virginia, including all of Grayson County, Lee County, Scott County, Washington County, and the City of Bristol, as well as parts of Smyth County, Wise County, and Wythe County.

The district is located entirely within Virginia's 9th congressional district, and overlaps with the 1st, 4th, 5th, and 6th districts of the Virginia House of Delegates. It borders the states of Kentucky, Tennessee, and North Carolina.

Recent election results

2019

2015

2011

Federal and statewide results in District 40

Historical results
All election results below took place prior to 2011 redistricting, and thus were under different district lines.

2007

2003

1999

1995

List of members

References

Virginia Senate districts
Grayson County, Virginia
Lee County, Virginia
Scott County, Virginia
Washington County, Virginia
Bristol, Virginia
Smyth County, Virginia
Wise County, Virginia
Wythe County, Virginia